Bertrand Poirot-Delpech (10 February 1929, Paris – 14 November 2006) was a French journalist, essayist and novelist. He was elected to the Académie française on 10 April 1986. He is the father of writer Julie Wolkenstein.

Early years

Poirot-Delpech came from a family of academics and doctors. His ancestors included several surgeons. His father died in 1940.

He attended Stanislas and Louis-le-Grand secondary schools, completing his khâgne at the latter.

Career

At the age of 22, he began his career as a journalist with Le Monde. He successively had charge of several sections: the university column (1951–1955),  the "Great Trials" column (1956–1959) and the theatre criticism section (1960–1971). In 1972, he took over as a reviewer for the "Monde des Livres". Beginning in 1989, he wrote a weekly column in Le Monde.

Bertrand Poirot-Delpech chaired the Syndicat de la Critique Dramatique (1970–1972) and he was a member of the reading committee of the Comédie-Française.

In addition to several published novels, he wrote screenplays for television and the cinema.

Bibliography

1958  Le Grand Dadais  (Denoël)
1960  La Grasse Matinée  (Denoël)
1962  L'Envers de l'eau  (Denoël)
1966  Au soir le soir  (Mercure de France)
1969  Finie la comédie  (Gallimard)
1970  La Folle de Lituanie  (Gallimard) - Grand Prix du roman de l'Académie française
1973  Les Grands de ce monde  (Gallimard)
1976  La Légende du siècle  (Gallimard)
1979  Saïd et moi  (Le Seuil)
1980  Marie Duplessis  (Ramsay)
1981  Feuilletons  (Gallimard)
1982  Le Couloir du dancing  (Gallimard)
1985  L'Été 36  (Gallimard)
1986  Bonjour Sagan  (Herscher)
1987  Monsieur Barbie n'a rien à dire  (Gallimard)
1988  Le Golfe de Gascogne  (Gallimard)
1989  Traversées  (Flammarion)
1994  L'Amour de l'humanité  (Gallimard)
1995  Diagonales  (Gallimard)
1997  L'Alerte, théâtre  (Gallimard)
1998  Théâtre d'ombres, journal  (Le Seuil)
1998  Papon : un crime de bureau  (Stock)
1999  Monsieur le Prince  (Gallimard)
2001  J'écris Paludes  (Gallimard)

External links
  L'Académie française

1929 births
2006 deaths
Writers from Paris
Collège Stanislas de Paris alumni
Lycée Louis-le-Grand alumni
20th-century French journalists
Members of the Académie Française
Prix Interallié winners
Grand Prix du roman de l'Académie française winners
French male essayists
French male novelists
20th-century French novelists
20th-century French essayists
French theatre critics
20th-century French male writers